Beth Beskin (born November 24, 1959) is an American politician who served in the Georgia House of Representatives from the 54th district from 2015 to 2019. In September 2019, Beskin announced she was running for a seat on the Georgia Supreme Court.

References

1959 births
Living people
Republican Party members of the Georgia House of Representatives
Women state legislators in Georgia (U.S. state)
21st-century American women politicians
21st-century American politicians